Ralf Grabsch (born 7 April 1973) is a German former road racing cyclist, who currently works as a directeur sportif for UCI Continental team . He was born in Wittenberg and is the older brother of fellow road racing cyclist Bert Grabsch.

Major results

1994
 2nd Overall Course de la Paix
1st Stage 9
1995
 1st Stage 12 Commonwealth Bank Classic
1996
 1st Hessen-Rundfahrt
1997
 1st Köln-Schuld-Frechen
 1st Stage 3b Bayern-Rundfahrt
1998
 1st Osterrennen
 1st Stage 3 Tour du Poitou-Charentes
 2nd Overall Ster der Beloften
1999
 1st Overall Ster der Beloften
1st Stage 3
2001
 1st Criterium Altenkirchen
2003
 2nd Overall Ytong Bohemia Tour
2004
 1st City Night Rede
2006
 1st Rund um den Magdeburger Dom
 1st Stage 3 Bayern-Rundfahrt
 1st Stage 1 Cologne Classic
2007
 1st Rund um die Wittenberger Altstadt

References

External links

1973 births
Living people
German male cyclists
People from Wittenberg
Cyclists from Saxony-Anhalt
People from Bezirk Halle